Bangour Village Hospital was a psychiatric hospital located west of Dechmont in West Lothian, Scotland. During the First World War it formed part of the much larger Edinburgh War Hospital.

History

The hospital was modelled on the village system of patient care, the best example of which is the Alt-Scherbitz hospital at Schkeuditz in Germany which was developed in the 1870s. It was designed by Hippolyte Blanc and officially opened as the Edinburgh District Asylum in October 1906. At the centre of the site was an Edwardian Baroque hall. The site also incorporated a power station, workshops, a bakery, stores, a kitchen and a laundry.

The hospital was requisitioned by the War Office during the First World War but reverted to psychiatric work between the wars. A Romanesque style church, designed by Harold Ogle Tarbolton, was built between 1924 and 1930.

During the Second World War the hospital was occupied by the War Office again and the patients were evacuated to Hartwoodhill Hospital

Temporary marquees and prefabricated huts were erected to cope with the demand for wartime bed space: the temporary facility became noted for its burns and plastic surgery unit which was established in 1940. After the war the temporary facility was developed as Bangour General Hospital.

After general medical services transferred to the newly-opened St John's Hospital in nearby Livingston, Bangour General Hospital closed in 1991. The Village Hospital also started to wind down after the opening of St Johns with the last remaining ward closing in 2004.

Railway branch line
When the hospital was built, road access was poor, and considerable volumes of coal and general stores were required for the running of the facility. A private railway line was built, branching from the former Edinburgh and Bathgate Railway line at Uphall, and terminating at Bangour railway station. It was authorised by the Edinburgh and District Lunacy Board Act of 30 July 1900, and it was opened to passengers on 19 June 1905.

During the First World War the road network was improved, and the railway became unnecessary; it was closed on 1 August 1921, although passenger services probably ceased on 4 May 1921.

Present use
The closed hospital was used as a filming location for the 2005 film The Jacket, starring Keira Knightley and Adrien Brody.

During September 2009, the hospital grounds were used as the site for "Exercise Green Gate", a counter-terrorist exercise run by the Scottish Government to test de-contamination procedures in the event of a nuclear, chemical or biological incident. This involved 250 volunteer "casualties" and 400 emergency staff.

On 1 October 2015 Planning Permission for a residential and mixed use redevelopment of the former hospital site is being sought. The application notes some of the listed buildings at the site may be proposed for full demolition in a subsequent application. This may include villas 7,8,9 and 21, with other buildings potentially proposed for partial demolition.

In early 2020, it was confirmed that five of the listed buildings on site were in very poor condition and were planned to be demolished, while the remaining ten buildings were due to be redeveloped for housing.

References

External links
 Pictures of Bangour Village Hospital
 Bangour Village Hospital, by Dazzababes: a photoset on Flickr
 Bangour Village Hospital Villas 3, 4, and 5, by mybabyangel85: a photoset on Flickr
 Bangour Village Hospital – Before and After: A video on YouTube
 Bangour Village Hospital – Urban Exploration Photography
 Lothian Health Services Archive

Hospital buildings completed in 1906
Hospitals in West Lothian
Former psychiatric hospitals in Scotland
Hippolyte Blanc buildings
Category A listed buildings in West Lothian
Defunct hospitals in Scotland
1906 establishments in Scotland